"The Peasant and the Devil" is a German fairy tale collected by the Brothers Grimm, tale number 189.  It is Aarne-Thompson type 1030, man and ogre share the harvest.

Synopsis
A peasant found a devil in his fields, sitting on a fire.  He guessed he was sitting on treasure, and the devil offered it if for two years, half of the crop was his.  The peasant agreed, and said that to prevent disputes, the half above the ground was the devil's, and the half below the peasant's.  When the devil agreed, the peasant planted turnips.

When harvest time came, the devil saw his leaves and the peasant's turnips, and said they must do it the other way round the next year.  The peasant agreed and planted wheat.  At harvest, the devil found he got nothing but stubble.  Having been outwitted twice, he retreated into the earth in a fury, and the peasant took the treasure.

References

External links

The Peasant and the Devil 
 The Peasant and the Devil

Peasant and the Devil
Peasant and the Devil
Peasant and the Devil
Peasant and the Devil
Peasant and the Devil
Peasant and the Devil
ATU 1000-1199